The Sud-Est SE-2300 or S.N.C.A.S.E. SE-2300 was a two/three seat low wing, single engine touring aircraft, built just after World War II in France. The SE-2310 was a tricycle undercarriage variant. Neither type went into production.

Design and development
Pierre Satre, who later was chief designer of the Concorde, began the SE-2300 design during World War II and it first flew on 26 October 1945.  It was a conventionally laid out, all metal, two seat, single engine cantilever monoplane, with tapered low wings having 4° of dihedral built around inverted U-section main and auxiliary spars.  The wings had a centre section integral with the fuselage and two outer panels, all covered with electrically welded skin. There were plain flaps, with a maximum deflection of 40°.

The fuselage of the SE-2300 was constructed from four pre-formed panels welded together. A 140 hp (104 kW) Renault Bengali 4 four cylinder, inverted, air-cooled inline engine, fed from a fuselage tank, drove a two blade propeller.  The over-wing cabin seated two side-by-side with dual controls.  Behind these seats was space for a third (optional in the SE-2300 and standard in the SE-2310 variant) and baggage.  There were access doors and rear view transparencies on both sides. At the rear, the tailplane was mounted at mid-fuselage and the fin and deep rudder were straight tapered except near the keel and almost triangular above the fuselage.

The first and only SE-2300 had a fixed conventional undercarriage with oleo-pneumatic springing, faired main legs and wheels and a swivelling tailwheel.  The two SE-2310s had tricycle undercarriages, the first unfaired but the second with faired legs and spats.

Operational history
With a four-seat version, the SE-2311 under development but unbuilt, the three seat SE-3010 was entered into a 1946 French Transport Ministry contest for a four-seat tourist aircraft in February 1946.  It was not successful, the award going to the Nord 1200 Norécrin and development of the SE-2300 series was abandoned. The last example remained in use until at least 1956 as a company hack.

Variants
SE-2300 Original version, two or three seats, conventional undercarriage.
SE-2310 Three seats, tricycle undercarriage. Two built, the second with faired undercarriage legs and wheels.
SE-2311 Three seat,  Regnier 4L-00 engine.

Specifications (SE-2300)

References

1940s French sport aircraft
SE-2300
Sud-Est aircraft
Low-wing aircraft
Single-engined tractor aircraft
Aircraft first flown in 1945